The Dragon of Shandon is a nighttime parade held annually on October 31 in Cork, Ireland. The parade celebrates the Gaelic festival of Samhain.

History
The parade began in 2006 and is facilitated by Cork Community Art Link.

References

Festivals in Ireland
Annual events in Ireland
Autumn events in the Republic of Ireland